Events from the year 1714 in Canada.

Incumbents
French Monarch: Louis XIV
British and Irish Monarch: Anne (died August 1), George I (starting August 1)

Governors
Governor General of New France: Philippe de Rigaud Vaudreuil
Colonial Governor of Louisiana: Antoine de la Mothe Cadillac
Governor of Nova Scotia: Francis Nicholson
Governor of Placentia: John Moody

Events

Births
 December 1 - Pierre Gaultier de La Vérendrye, explorer (died 1755)

Deaths
 October 3 - Jeanne Le Ber, religious recluse (born 1662)
 August - Pierre Maisonnat dit Baptiste, military (born 1663)

References

 
Canada
14